This is a list of current further education and higher education colleges in Scotland. Most colleges provide both levels of qualification.

Further education colleges offer courses for people over the age of sixteen, involving school-level qualifications such as Higher Grade exams, as well as work-based learning.

Higher education colleges offer degree-level courses, such as diplomas.

Scottish colleges are funded primarily by the Scottish Funding Council, with tuition fees paid by individual students or their sponsors.

Not included in this list are a number of colleges which became affiliated with the UHI Millennium Institute, a grouping of further education colleges mostly located in the Highlands, in 2001. Since January 2011, these 13 colleges are now officially federated as constituent colleges of the University of the Highlands and Islands upon being granted university status.

See also
 Education in Scotland
 List of further education colleges in England
 List of further education colleges in Wales
 List of universities in Scotland
 List of further education colleges in Northern Ireland

References

 
 
Scottish education-related lists
Lists of buildings and structures in Scotland
Scotland